Krzysztof Wilde (born 11 January 1966 in Gdańsk) – Polish engineer, full professor of civil engineering, Rector of Gdańsk University of Technology since 3 June 2019

Professional career 
Expert in bridge structures, structural mechanics and diagnostics of civil structures. Head of the Department of Mechanics of Materials and Structures (1995–2019), dean of Faculty of Civil Engineering of Gdańsk University of Technology in cadences 2004-2008 and 2016-2020.  Member of the Committee on Civil Engineering and Hydroengineering of the Polish Academy of Sciences and Committee on Mechanics of the Polish Academy of Sciences. Author or co-author of over 200 publications and 4 patents. In 1995-1999 he was working at the Tokyo University achieving position of associate professor.

Since 2020 chairman of the Fahrenheit Union of Universities in Gdańsk.

References

External links 
 Polish Science

1966 births
Gdańsk University of Technology alumni
Academic staff of the Gdańsk University of Technology
Polish engineers
Polish inventors
Living people